Orok may refer to:
Orok people, an ethnic group of Sakhalin, Russia
Orok language, a Tungusic language of Russia

See also
 Oroch (disambiguation)
 Orrock (disambiguation)
 Oruk
 Urok (disambiguation)

Language and nationality disambiguation pages